Thomas Katsikis (born March 12, 1967) is a former Greek–American professional basketball player. His twin brother Nick Katsikis is also a former professional basketball player.

High school
Tom and Nick Katsikis played with Cherry Hill High School East from 1982 to 1986. Tom scored more than 1,500 points in these four years having 20.2 points per game, becoming one of only four players who scored more than 1,000 in school history. Along his brother, he led their high school to a 69–15 record. On 22 November 2015, the Katsikis brothers became members of the Cherry Hill High School East Hall of Fame.

College career
Katsikis played with the Temple Owls men's basketball team for two years. He was a member of the team which had a 32–2 record during 1987–88 season and was inducted into the Philadelphia Big 5 Hall of Fame Moreover, Katsikis and his teammates honored from their college on 10 March 2013, twenty five years after their achievement.

Professional career
In 1990, Katsikis signed with PAOK along with his brother Nick Katsikis. They became the first twins who ever played in the Greek Basketball League Tom has only one cap with PAOK and scoring seven points. The next season he joined to Dafni. Katsikis had 18 appearances and scored 139 points. He also played with Panellinios in the Greek A2 Basket League.

After, their retirement Tom and Nick Katsikis became owners of their family restaurant in Pennsauken Township, New Jersey.

References

1967 births
Living people
American expatriate basketball people in Greece
American men's basketball players
American people of Greek descent
Basketball players from New Jersey
Dafnis B.C. players
Greek men's basketball players
Greek Basket League players
P.A.O.K. BC players
Panellinios B.C. players
People from Cherry Hill, New Jersey
Cherry Hill High School East alumni
Sportspeople from Camden County, New Jersey
Temple Owls men's basketball players
Greek twins
American twins
Twin sportspeople
Small forwards